Thomas Kweku Aubyn is a Ghanaian politician and a member of the Second Parliament of the Fourth Republic representing the Gomoa East Constituency in the Central Region of Ghana.

Early life 
Thomas Kweku Aubyn was born at Gomoa East in the Central Region of Ghana.

Politics 
Aubyn was first elected into Parliament on the ticket of the National Democratic Congress for the Gomoa East Constituency in the Central Region of Ghana during the 1996 Ghanaian general elections. He polled 18,390 votes out of the 29,720 valid votes cast representing 43.20% over Kofi Nyarko-Annan of the New Patriotic Party who polled 10,547 votes representing 24.80% and Abraham Kofi Sackey of the Convention People's Party who polled 783 votes representing 1.80%.

References 

21st-century Ghanaian politicians
Ghanaian MPs 1997–2001
People from Central Region (Ghana)
Living people
20th-century Ghanaian lawyers
National Democratic Congress (Ghana) politicians
Year of birth missing (living people)